Roses is a studio album by American country artist, Kathy Mattea. It was released on July 30, 2002 via Narada Productions and was the twelfth studio project of her career. The album contained 12 tracks of original material that featured a Celtic-folk sound that was considered a departure from Mattea's previous works. It was also Mattea's first album following her exit from her longtime country label, Mercury/PolyGram. The album received mixed reviews from critics upon its release. One single was issued from the project and the album reached the top 40 of the American country albums chart.

Background
According to writer, Steve Huey, Kathy Mattea was considered among the most commercially-successful and respected country artists of her era. By 2002, Kathy Mattea had placed 18 singles in the top ten of the American country songs chart and won two Country Music Association Awards. After turning 40 years old, Mattea was ready to take a new direction in her professional life. She released one final album with her long-time label (Mercury/PolyGram) in 2000 called The Innocent Years. She then explored various Nashville labels, but decided it was time to explore other opportunities. Mattea instead signed with the Virgin Records subsidiary label, Narada, in 2002. Mattea was ready to experiment with other styles outside of her country roots, which prompted the development of Roses. She had been a fan of Celtic music for many years and was ready to make an album that honored that style. She described the project as "contemporary folk with a Celtic twist."

Recording and content
Roses was recorded at the Playground Recording Studios and was co-produced by Ed Cash and Mattea herself. A total of 12 tracks comprised the album project. Of them, two tracks were penned by Mattea: "Come Away with Me" and "The Slender Threads That Bind Us Here" (both co-written with Marcus Hummon). In describing the choice of material Mattea told the Chicago Tribune, "The songs I record have to ask some kind of [positive] question or have some kind of positive vision." Among the album's tracks was "Ashes in the Wind", which alluded to the death of a high school classmate. Another track, "Who We Are", centers around a turbulent mother-daughter relationship. Mattea also covered Kim Richey's original tune, "I'm Alright". The musical sound of the project was described by The Washington Post as "Celtic folk pop", while AllMusic found it to have a "Scottish/Irish" sound.

Release, singles, and critical reception

Roses was released on July 30, 2002 on Narada Productions and marked the twelfth studio album of Mattea's career. The disc was issued as a compact disc. It was later issued to digital sites, including Apple Music. Roses spent six weeks on the American Billboard Top Country Albums chart, peaking at number 38 in August 2002. It is Mattea's final album to date that has reached a top 40 position on the country albums chart. One single was spawned from the project: "They Are the Roses". According to Billboard, the song was intended to be released to adult contemporary radio, not country radio (unlike her previous releases). "They Are the Roses" was officially released on July 19, 2002 to Americana (Triple A) radio.

The album received mixed reviews upon its release. Maria Konicki Dinoia of AllMusic gave the project 2.5 stars out of five, but praised the project in her writing of her review: "This album isn't the country music of the former Grammy-winner and CMA vocalist of the year, but it wins high marks for creative expression and originality." Geoffrey Himes of The Washington Post described the production of some selections to have a "lush arrangement", but was more critical of Mattea's vocal performance, "Only three of the dozen songs are strong enough to remind us how effective Mattea's invitingly personal soprano can be with the right material," Himes noted.

Track listing

Personnel
All credits are adapted from the liner notes of Roses and AllMusic.

Musical personnel
 David Angell – Strings
 David Barnes – Background vocals
 Jim Brock – Percussion
 Chris Carmichael – Fiddle
 Ed Cash – Acoustic guitar, background vocals, banjo, electric guitar, mandolin, synthesizer
 John Catchings – Strings
 Dave Davidson – Strings
 Gerry Gillespie – Bass
 Bob Halligan Jr. – Background vocals
 Byron House – Acoustic bass
 Tim Lauer – Accordion
 Joanie Madden – Whistle
 Kathy Mattea – Lead vocals, foot stomping
 John Mock – Concertina, harmonium, whistle
 Dan Needham – Drums, percussion, hand jive
 Bebo Norman – Background vocals
 Tom Sims – Electric guitar
 Pam Sixfin – Strings
 Mark Stallings – B3 organ, piano
 Kris Thompson – Strings
 Carson Whitsett – Piano

Technical personnel
 B.J. Aberle – Assistant engineer
 Ed Cash – Producer
 Mick Conley – Engineer, mixing engineer
 Christopher Diehl – Assistant engineer
 Connie Gage – Design
 Russ Harrington – Photography
 Carl Marsh – String arrangements
 Kathy Mattea – Producer
 Trevor Sadler – Mastering

Chart performance

Release history

References

2002 albums
Albums produced by Ed Cash
Albums produced by Kathy Mattea
Kathy Mattea albums
Narada Productions albums